Taiyafeh-ye Hazrat-e Soleyman (also Romanized as Ţāīyafeh-ye Ḩaẕrat-e Soleymān; also known as Emāmzādeh Soleymān, Ḩaẕrat-e Soleymān, Ḩazrat-e Soleymān, and Hujrat Sulaiman) is a village in Cheleh Rural District, in the Central District of Gilan-e Gharb County, Kermanshah Province, Iran. At the 2006 census, its population was 104, in 19 families.

References 

Populated places in Gilan-e Gharb County